David Loman (大尾鱸鰻) is a 2013 Taiwanese comedy film directed by Chiu Li-kwan.

Cast 
 Chu Ke-liang
 Amber Kuo
 Tony Yang
 Lin Mei-hsiu
 Miao Ke-li as Nana

Reception 
It was the 3rd highest-grossing film of 2013 in Taiwan, with NT$428 million.

Film Business Asia's Derek Elley gave the film a rating of 6 out of 10.

A sequel, was released on February 5, 2016. Aboriginals in Taiwan accused the film of bigotry.

References

External links 
 

2013 comedy films
2013 films
Taiwanese comedy films
Taiwanese-language films
Triad films
Fiction set in the 1990s
Chinese New Year films
2010s Hong Kong films